Daniel Grégorich Hechavarria (born 7 May 1996) is a Cuban Greco-Roman wrestler. He won the gold medal in the 87 kg event at the 2018 Central American and Caribbean Games held in Barranquilla, Colombia.

Career 

At the 2019 Pan American Games held in Lima, Peru, he won one of the bronze medals in the men's 87 kg event.

In the same year, he competed in the 87 kg event at the 2019 World Wrestling Championships held in Nur-Sultan, Kazakhstan without winning a medal. He was eliminated in his fourth match by Rustam Assakalov of Uzbekistan.

He competed at the 2020 Summer Olympics.

Major results

References

External links 
 

Living people
Cuban male sport wrestlers
Wrestlers at the 2019 Pan American Games
Medalists at the 2019 Pan American Games
Pan American Games bronze medalists for Cuba
Pan American Games medalists in wrestling
Central American and Caribbean Games bronze medalists for Cuba
Competitors at the 2018 Central American and Caribbean Games
Central American and Caribbean Games medalists in wrestling
Wrestlers at the 2020 Summer Olympics
1996 births
Sportspeople from Havana
Olympic wrestlers of Cuba
20th-century Cuban people
21st-century Cuban people